Mickal Lee Horacek (born July 7, 1973) is a former American football wide receiver of the Arena Football League. He played college football at Iowa State. Horacek played professionally for the Iowa Barnstormers, New Jersey / Las Vegas Gladiators, Indiana Firebirds, New York Dragons and the Kansas City Brigade.

After retiring from football, Horacek became a realtor in Omaha.

References

External links
ArenaFan stats

1973 births
Living people
American football wide receivers
American football linebackers
Iowa State Cyclones football players
Iowa Barnstormers players
Jacksonville Jaguars players
New Jersey Gladiators players
Las Vegas Gladiators players
Indiana Firebirds players
New York Dragons players
Kansas City Brigade players
Sportspeople from Omaha, Nebraska